Madan-e Olya (also Romanized as Ma‘dan-e ‘Olyā; also known as Ma‘dan-e Bālā, Bār-e Ma‘dan-e Bālā, Bār Ma‘dan ‘Olyā, Ma‘dan, and Maidān) is a village in Firuzeh Rural District, in the Central District of Firuzeh County, Razavi Khorasan Province, Iran. At the 2006 census, its population was 557, in 164 families. The historic Nishapur turquoise has been mined from the Rivand mountain near this village. An ancient city called Rivand of Nishapur has also been probably situated around the region of this village. Some Iranologists, believe that Rivand Mountain has been home to Adur Burzen-Mihr (a holy Zoroastrian fire temple).

References 

Populated places in Firuzeh County